Pteris biaurita, the thinleaf brake, is a fern species in the genus Pteris. It is widely distributed around the world, including Africa, the Americas, and Asia. The plants are 70–110 cm in height, with erect, woody rhizomes 2–2.5 cm in diameter, and the apex densely covered with brown scales.

Synonyms
 Campteria biaurita (L.) Hook.
 Campteria galeotti (Fée) T. Moore
 Litobrochia biaurita (L.) J. Sm.
 Litobrochia galeottii Fée
 Pteris flavicaulis Hayata

References

 Sp. Pl. 2: 1076 1753.
 The Plant List
 Encyclopedia of Life
 Flora of China

biaurita